The 1931 Giro di Lombardia was the 27th edition of the Giro di Lombardia cycle race and was held on 25 October 1931. The race started and finished in Milan. The race was won by Alfredo Binda.

General classification

References

1931
Giro di Lombardia
Giro di Lombardia